The 1936–37 Coppa Italia was the 2nd edition of the tournament under the organization of the Higher Directory.

All teams from Serie A, Serie B and Serie C took part to this competition, which included a first phase, with elimination rounds reserved to B and C teams, and a final phase, where the 16 winners of the first phase met 16 Serie A teams. All the matches were played in a single leg with eventual replay on the model of the FA Cup, homefields were decided by drawing except for the final match in Florence.

The trophy was won by Genova 1893, which defeated 1–0 Roma in the final match, played at the Giovanni Berta Stadium in Florence on June 6, 1937. Winning the cup, Genova 1893 also gained the qualification to the 1937 edition of the Mitropa Cup.

Qualifying round
Serie C qualifying and preliminary rounds were under geographical zones.

1st Preliminary Round 
52 clubs are added.

Replay matches

* Cerignola and Pistoiese qualify after drawing of lots.

2nd Preliminary Round 

Replay matches

* Mantova qualify after drawing of lots.

3rd Preliminary Round 
All 16 Serie B clubs are added (Catanzarese, Catania, Hellas Verona, Livorno, Atalanta, Brescia, L'Aquila, Viareggio, Pisa, Messina, Pro Vercelli, Spezia, Cremonese, Palermo, Venezia, Modena).

Replay matches

* Spezia qualify after drawing of lots.

Knockout stage
All 16 Serie A clubs are added (Bari, Milano, Alessandria, Genova 1893, Lazio, Sampierdarenese, Bologna, Fiorentina, Ambrosiana-Inter, Napoli, Lucchese, Juventus, Roma, Triestina, Torino, Novara).

Legend:

Final

Top goalscorers

Sources 

Almanacco Illustrato del Calcio–La Storia 1898–2004, Panini Edizioni, Modena, September 2005

References

rsssf.com
emeroteca.coni.it

Coppa Italia seasons
Coppa Italia
Italia